Stephen John Oram is an English actor, comedian, writer, and filmmaker. He is known for his role in the 2012 film Sightseers, which he also co-wrote.

Life and career
Oram was born in Melton Mowbray, Leicestershire, England.

He started as a character comedian on the comedy circuit and performed several comedy shows at the Edinburgh Fringe with comedy partner Tom Meeten during the early 2000s. He also appeared at Ealing Live, a comedy night at Ealing Studios, where he met and started working with Alice Lowe.

In 2002, Oram and Meeten wrote and starred in Channel 4's Matthew & Tone: Tales of Friendship and Innocence. It was directed by Dominic Brigstocke and screened in season 5 of the Comedy Lab series. Oram also composed much of the music used in the show.

Oram appeared in various TV & film roles throughout the 2000s including the second series of People Like Us (2001), the feature film It's All Gone Pete Tong (2004) starring Paul Kaye, Tittybangbang (2006–07) and Suburban Shootout (2006). He also played Donnie the tramp in series 3 of The Mighty Boosh (2007), written by and starring Julian Barratt and Noel Fielding.

In 2008 his short film Connections screened at Cannes Film Festival as part of the official Straight 8 selection.

He also appeared alongside Alice Lowe as a support act in Steve Coogan's 2008–09 stand up tour "Steve Coogan is.....Alan Partridge and other less successful characters".

Oram has written and directed numerous short films under the pseudonym "Steve Aura" and released under the banner of Lincoln Studios.

With Meeten he performs a long-running comedy show in London called Oram & Meeten's Club Fantastico.

In 2012 Oram and Lowe starred in Ben Wheatley's dark comedy Sightseers. The film was written by Oram and Lowe with additional material by Amy Jump.

Since then Oram has found roles in films including Edgar Wright and Simon Pegg's The World's End (2013), The Canal (2014), Altar (2014), and Paddington (2014)

On television he has appeared in Wipers Times (2013) written by Ian Hislop and Nick Newman, an episode of The Secrets (2014) alongside Alison Steadman and Olivia Colman, an episode of Noel Fielding's Luxury Comedy (2014), the Jack Thorne series Glue (2014) and The Living and the Dead (2016).

Oram released his directorial debut Aaaaaaaah! in 2015, a film in which the characters communicate entirely in ape-like grunts. It starred Oram himself alongside Julian Barratt, Toyah Willcox, Julian Rhind-Tutt, Noel Fielding and Holli Dempsey. The film's soundtrack features a number of tracks from the King Crimson ProjeKcts albums.

Filmography

Film

Television

Awards and recognition

References

External links
Lincoln Studios website

English male comedians
English male television actors
People from Melton Mowbray
Alumni of the University of East Anglia
Living people
English male film actors
Male actors from Leicestershire
Year of birth missing (living people)